Romaine or cos lettuce (Lactuca sativa L. var. longifolia) is a variety of lettuce that grows in a tall head of sturdy dark green leaves with firm ribs down their centers. Unlike most lettuces, it is tolerant of heat. In North America, romaine is often sold as whole heads or as "hearts" that have had the outer leaves removed and are often packaged together. 

Commercially sold romaine lettuce has occasionally been the subject of product warnings by both U.S. and Canadian health authorities warning that consumer supplies can become contaminated with or host pathogenic E.coli bacteria. Cattle can harbor the bacteria without ill effects, and be asymptomatic carriers of the bacterium. Lettuce becomes contaminated with the bacterium as the result of cattle manure being used to fertilize crop fields, or the proximity of cattle pastures and feedlots to water sources used to irrigate crops.

Origin and etymology 
In North American English it is known as "romaine" lettuce and in British English the names "cos" lettuce and "romaine" lettuce are both used. Many dictionaries trace the word cos to the name of the Greek island of Cos, from which the lettuce was presumably introduced. Other authorities trace cos to the Arabic word for lettuce,   .

The first mention of cos lettuce in English dates from the late 17th century in John Evelyn's 1699 work Acetaria. A discourse of sallets. 

Cultural significance
For 3000 years (from at least 2700 BC), lettuce was associated with the ancient Egyptian god of fertility, Min, for its resemblance to the phallus.

Romaine lettuce may be used in the Passover Seder ritual feast as a type of bitter herb. It symbolises the bitterness inflicted by the Egyptians while the Israelites were slaves in Egypt.

The day of 22 Germinal in the French Republican Calendar was dedicated to romaine lettuce, as "".

Cuisine

Romaine is a common salad green, and is the usual lettuce used in Caesar salad. Romaine lettuce is commonly used in Middle Eastern cuisine. Romaine, like other lettuces, may also be cooked. For example, it can be braised or made into soup. The thick ribs, especially on the older outer leaves, have a milky fluid that gives the romaine its typically bitter herb taste.

In North American supermarkets, romaine is widely available year-round.

Food safety issues

From November 2017 through January 2018, the Public Health Agency of Canada (PHA) identified romaine as being linked to illness in 41 persons in Canada. A probably related outbreak affected 25 people in 15 states of the U.S. who ate leafy greens, but the U.S. Centers for Disease Control (CDC) were unable to confirm that it was romaine in particular. There was one death. The disease agent was Shiga toxin-producing E. coli O157:H7. The most recent illness started on December 12, 2017; the PHA declared the outbreak over on January 10, 2018, and the CDC declared it over on January 25.

In response to another E. coli O157:H7 outbreak, which probably began in mid-March 2018, the CDC recommended in April 2018 that consumers not buy or eat romaine lettuce unless they could confirm it was not from the Yuma, Arizona, growing region. On May 22, 2018, after a month-long warning, the CDC announced it was now safe to consume romaine again. The outbreak killed five people and caused 89 hospitalizations across 32 states.

In June 2018, the FDA traced the source of the latest E. coli outbreak to water from a canal located in Yuma, Arizona.

In November 2018, the US CDC and the PHA of Canada issued a warning to consumers that romaine lettuce should not be consumed in any form, and that they should dispose of any currently on hand. The same strain of E. coli identified in the 2017-2018 outbreak was implicated. At least 43 people became ill in this outbreak, which the FDA traced to one of six counties in Central California: Monterey, San Benito, San Luis Obispo, Santa Barbara, Santa Cruz and Ventura. As of January 9, 2019, the U.S. Centers for Disease Control and Prevention (CDC) has declared the most recent Escherichia coli O157:H7 outbreak linked to California grown romaine lettuce over.

Growers
Many US growers of romaine lettuce farm in Salinas in the summer and the Imperial Valley and Yuma in the winter, relying on day laborers crossing the border from Mexico. Much of the romaine lettuce sold in northern Europe is grown in southern Spain, relying on migrant laborers from Africa.

See also

Notes

References

 Kirschmann, John D. & Dunne, Lavon J. Nutrition Almanac, s.v. .

External links
 

Leaf vegetables
Food plant cultivars
Lettuce